Kalateh-ye Shur may refer to:
 Kalateh-ye Shur, Esfarayen, North Khorasan Province
 Kalateh-ye Shur, Jajrom, North Khorasan Province
 Kalateh-ye Shur, Khoshab, Razavi Khorasan Province